The BR-386 is a Brazilian federal highway running between the southern states of Rio Grande do Sul and Santa Catarina.

Economic Importance 
The highway is called the Production Highway due to its high importance for the state. Through it all the production of soy, corn, wheat, meat, wood, furniture, among other products of the region is drained. In the city of Ametista do Sul, close to Iraí, there is the largest production of amethyst in the world. Close to Lajeado is one of the largest productions of tobacco on the planet. In Santa Catarina, the highway ends near Chapecó, the largest regional hub in the west of the state. In general, cities with significant GDP are on the side of the highway.

Duplication
The 66 km stretch between Canoas and Tabaí was doubled before 2010. The 34 km duplication between Tabaí and Estrela started in 2010 and only ended in 2018, due to the financial crisis in Brazil and the purposeful obstacles carried out by FUNAI, socialists , and indigenous communities. The 7 km stretch between Estrela and Lajeado was also doubled before 2010.

In 2019, the highway was granted for 30 years to CCR Viasul. With that, the highway will be duplicated in the 176 km stretch between Lajeado and Carazinho. The works are expected to start in 2021 and finish in 2036. The duplication works will follow the following order: from Lajeado to Marques de Souza (22 km): between 2021 and 2023; from Estrela to Lajeado (adjustments): between 2022 and 2023; from Fontoura Xavier to Soledade (22 km): between 2023 and 2024; from Soledade to Tio Hugo (33 km): between 2024 and 2025; from Marques de Souza to Fontoura Xavier (55 km): between 2026 and 2028; from Tio Hugo to Carazinho (40 km): between 2029 and 2030; from Tabaí to Canoas (readjustment): between 2034 and 2036.

Gallery

External links
 Road information from the Brazilian Ministry of Transportation

References

Federal highways in Brazil